The aboriginal people of the Columbia river valley used urine to cure acorns. The settlers of European origin in that region gave the dish the name Chinook Olives. 

About 35 litres of acorns were placed in a hole near the entrance of a house. The acorns were then covered with a thin layer of grass and then dirt. Urine from every family member was collected and deposited in the hole for the next 5 – 6 months. 

The dish was considered a delicacy.

References
"Northwest Plateau Culture".
"Wanderings of an Artist Among the Indians of North America".
"Handbook of American Indians north of Mexico, Volume 1 ". 

Edible nuts and seeds
Native American cuisine
Foods and drinks produced with excrement